The Continental Cup 2008–09 was the 12th edition of the IIHF Continental Cup. The season started on September 19, 2008, and finished on January 18, 2009.

The tournament was won by MHC Martin, who led the final group.

The points system used in this tournament was: the winner in regular time won 3 points, the loser 0 points; in case of a tie, an overtime and a penalty shootout is played, the winner in penalty shootouts or overtime won 2 points and the loser won 1 point.

Preliminary round

Group A
(Novi Sad, Serbia)

Group A standings

First Group Stage

Group B
(Elektrėnai, Lithuania)

Group B standings

Group C
(Miercurea Ciuc, Romania)

Group C standings

 HK Liepājas Metalurgs,
 Keramin Minsk,
 HDK Stavbar Maribor,
 Gornyak Rudny,
 HC Bolzano,
 Coventry Blaze     :  bye

Second Group Stage

Group D
(Liepāja, Latvia)

Group D standings

Group E
(Bolzano, Italy)

Group E standings

 Dragons de Rouen,
 MHC Martin     :  bye

Final stage

Final Group
(Rouen, France)

Final Group standings

References
 Official IIHF tournament page

2008–09 in European ice hockey
IIHF Continental Cup